Katarzyna Bronisława Woźniak (born 5 October 1989) is a Polish speed skater. She is a silver and bronze medalist of the Olympic Games.

Personal life
Katarzyna Woźniak was born in Warsaw, Poland. In 2005, she graduated the School of Sports Championships in Zakopane. She is studying at the Academy of Physical Education in Kraków. In 2010, she was awarded the Knight's Cross of the Order of the Rebirth of Poland. Katarzyna's fiancée is Konrad Niedźwiedzki also Polish speed skater.

Olympic Games 
At the Olympic Games in Vancouver 2010 she was 28th individual on distance 3000 m and won bronze medal with team Katarzyna Bachleda-Curuś, Natalia Czerwonka and Luiza Złotkowska. At the Olympic Games in Sochi 2014 she won silver medal with the same team and was 15th individual on distance 5000 m.

References

External links
 Archive of Katarzyna Woźniak's profile at SCG
 Archive of Katarzyna Woźniak's profile, from vancouver2010.com

1989 births
Polish female speed skaters
Speed skaters at the 2010 Winter Olympics
Speed skaters at the 2014 Winter Olympics
Olympic speed skaters of Poland
Medalists at the 2010 Winter Olympics
Medalists at the 2014 Winter Olympics
Olympic medalists in speed skating
Olympic silver medalists for Poland
Olympic bronze medalists for Poland
Knights of the Order of Polonia Restituta
Speed skaters from Warsaw
Living people
World Single Distances Speed Skating Championships medalists